State Route 767 (SR 767) is a short state highway in the Ruby Valley region of Elko County, Nevada. It follows a portion of Ruby Valley Road.

Route description
SR 767 begins in Ruby Valley, north of the agricultural town of the same name, where Elko County Route 788 transitions from gravel road to pavement. The highway continues north along the eastern foothills of the Ruby Mountains to its northern terminus at a Y-junction with Secret Pass Road (SR 229) east of Ruby Dome.

History

Ruby Valley Road follows part of what was once known as the Hastings Cutoff, a route which was at the time thought to be a more direct route of the California Trail through the northeastern part of Nevada.

SR 767 was established as a state highway on July 1, 1976. It has remained unchanged since its adoption into the state highway system.

Major intersections

See also

References

767
Transportation in Elko County, Nevada